Coronidia subpicta is a moth of the family Sematuridae. It is known from the Neotropics, including Costa Rica.

The wingspan is 52–59 mm.

The larvae feed on a wide range of plants, including Oreopanax, Gesneriaceae, Ardisia, Myrsine, Piperaceae, Solanum, Ludwigia and Clavija species. The caterpillars have rows of black spines either side of the dorsal midline and five pairs of prolegs.

References 

Sematuridae
Moths described in 1856